OCBC Cycle is an annual mass participation cycling game event held on closed public roads which encourages riders of all skill levels to take part. The last edition was held on 8 May 2022.

OCBC Cycle featured in-person rides on closed roads in 2022 , after it adopted a virtual format for two years due to the Covid-19 pandemic.

Participants 
The event has gained popularity each year with more than 5,300 participants in 2009 and 9,000 in 2010.  In 2011, over 10,000 participated in OCBC Cycle Singapore 2011.

Event Categories 
1) Criterium Events (ages 18 and above and subject to qualification)

Women's Open

Masters’ Open (for men aged 40 and above)

Men's Open

Professional Criterium

2) The Super Challenge (for ages 18 and above)

Distance:  59 km

Open to 1,500 participants

3) The Challenge (for ages 14 and above)

Distance:  39 km

Participants can register as:
 Individual
 Student
 Corporate Team of Four(4)
 School Team of 4
 Club/Interest Group team of 4

4) The Community Ride (for ages ten and above)

Distance:  24 km

Participants can register as:
 Individual
 Student
 4-Cyclist promo package

5) The Junior Challenge (for ages 10 to 12)

Duration: 30 minutes

Individual registration

6) Mighty Savers Kids Ride (for ages five to nine)

Distance:  5 km

Participants can register for/as:

Three (3) different age group categories:
 Individual
 Accompanying adult with child
 Family Package (two adults and one or two children, ages 5–9)

7) Tricycle Ride (for ages two to five)
Participants can register as individuals and can be accompanied by an adult
Distance:  100 m & 150 m

Joining Fee 
The most inexpensive ride for students is the Community Ride (24 km) priced at $42.50 with the launch special discount.  For adults, the early-bird fee is $89 for The Challenge (39 km) and $113 for The Super Challenge (59 km).
Discounts of up to 15% are available to 3 categories of participants:
a) OCBC Credit Card holders;
b) Loyal cyclists who have participated in the 2012 version of OCBC Cycle Singapore event and / or the 2013 version of OCBC Cycle Malaysia (“loyal cyclists”) and;
c) *Students. Such discount will apply to registration fees throughout the period of registration.

Trends 
Rising Trend

In recent years, Singapore has seen a large increase in the number of sporting events taking place in the city state.  Numerous marathons, triathlons, fun-runs and other mass participation events have been supported by government agencies and the public alike.

The government has taken the initiative to connect paths island wide to ensure seamless riding, as well as the introduction of more safety signs on the roads to encourage safe cycling.  The Land Transport Authority has also recently announced plans to install more bicycle kiosks around the island and to allow foldable bikes on the MRT trains so that more commuters would consider cycling.  In an effort for OCBC to promote safe cycling in Singapore, free cycling jerseys printed with safe cycling messages were also distributed to cyclists before the OCBC Cycle Singapore event. There has also been an increase in the number of cycling clubs in Singapore in recent years.

OCBC Cycle Singapore has carved a niche in the market as the first cycling event targeted at the mass market which caters to all levels of participants and is owned and organised by Spectrum Worldwide with OCBC bank as the title sponsor.

Fund Raising 
OCBC Cycle Singapore also recognises the need to give back to the community and has chosen to support the National Cancer Research Fund and the Singapore Children's Society.

References

External Links 
Official Website - https://www.ocbccycle.com/

Sport in Singapore
Cycling in Singapore
Cycle racing in Asia